Frank Albert Benford Jr. (July 10, 1883 – December 4, 1948) was an American electrical engineer and physicist best known for rediscovering and generalizing Benford's Law, a statistical statement about the occurrence of digits in lists of data. 

Benford is also known for having devised, in 1937, an instrument for measuring the refractive index of glass. An expert in optical measurements, he published 109 papers in the fields of optics and mathematics and was granted 20 patents on optical devices.

Early life 
He was born in Johnstown, Pennsylvania. His date of birth is given variously as May 29 or July 10, 1883. At the age of 6 his family home was destroyed by the Johnstown Flood.

Education 
He graduated from the University of Michigan in 1910.

Career 
Benford worked for General Electric, first in the Illuminating Engineering Laboratory for 18 years, then the Research Laboratory for 20 years until retiring in July 1948. He was working as a research physicist when he made the rediscovery of Benford's law, and spent years collecting data before publishing in 1938, citing more than 20,000 values from a diverse set of sources including statistics from baseball, atomic weights, the areas of rivers and numbering of articles in magazines.

Death 
He died suddenly at his home on December 4, 1948.

References

1883 births
1948 deaths
People from Johnstown, Pennsylvania
University of Michigan alumni
20th-century American physicists
Information theory
Optical engineers